The Andorran ambassador to France is the official diplomatic officer of Andorra to France, and has been occupied by the following persons:

List of heads of mission

References 

Official Bulletin of the Principality of Andorra:

Journal officiel de la République française:

 
France
Andorra